Charles Norman Adcock (21 February 1923 – 9 December 1998) was an English association football striker born in Boston, Lincolnshire.

He played 40 matches in the Italian Serie A from 1949 to 1951 with Padova and Triestina. He scored 11 goals.
When he returned he played for Peterborough United for a season

References

1923 births
1998 deaths
English footballers
Association football forwards
Serie A players
Serie B players
Calcio Padova players
U.S. Triestina Calcio 1918 players
Peterborough United F.C. players
Expatriate footballers in Italy
English expatriate footballers
People from Boston, Lincolnshire